Michayluk is a Ukrainian surname. Notable people with the surname include:

Dave Michayluk (born 1962), Canadian ice hockey player
Demitro Michayluk (1911–1990), Canadian educator and political figure

See also
Michaluk

Ukrainian-language surnames